Frank Clifford may refer to:
 Frank Clifford (cricketer)
 Frank Clifford (producer)